Yekeh Bagh or Yekkehbagh or Yekkeh Bagh or Yakkeh Bagh may refer to:

Yekeh Bagh, Markazi
Yekeh Bagh, Qom
Yekkehbagh, Dargaz, Razavi Khorasan Province
Yekkeh Bagh, Torbat-e Jam, Razavi Khorasan Province